Stephen Vail (1780–1864) was a founding partner of the Baldwin Locomotive Works in Philadelphia and the creator of the Speedwell Ironworks in Morristown, New Jersey.

Biography
Stephen Vail was born in Malapardis, New Jersey on June 28, 1780. He married Bethiah Youngs in 1801 and they had four children: Harriet Vail (1802–1828), Alfred Vail (1807–1859), George Vail (1809–1875), and Sarah Louise Davis Vail (1811–1887). He helped establish Speedwell Ironworks. His second wife was Mary Carter Hedges whom he married in 1848. His third wife was Phoebe Ann Miller whom he married in 1862.

He died in Morristown in June or July 1864.

Notes

References

External links
 

1780 births
1864 deaths
Businesspeople from New Jersey
Vail family